

Men's events

Women's events

Medal table

Events at the 1999 Pan American Games
Fencing at the Pan American Games
International fencing competitions hosted by Canada
1999 in fencing